France sent a delegation to compete at the 2008 Summer Paralympics in Beijing. France sent 119 athletes, who competed in 13 sports: archery, athletics, cycling, equestrian, wheelchair fencing, powerlifting, judo, sailing, shooting, swimming, table tennis, wheelchair tennis. There were some competitors that competed in rowing which made its debut in the Games. 

The country's flagbearer during the Games' opening ceremony was Assia El'Hannouni, who won four gold medals at the 2004 Summer Paralympics.

Medalists

Sports

Archery

Men

|-
|align=left|Maurice Champey
|align=left|Men's individual compound open
|674
|12
|Bye
|L 109-113
|colspan=4|Did not advance
|-
|align=left|Olivier Hatem
|align=left|Men's individual compound W1
|616
|7
|
|L 101-107
|colspan=4|Did not advance
|-
|align=left|Fabrice Meunier
|align=left|Men's individual recurve standing
|597
|13
|W 109-83
|W 101-96
|W 103-99
|W 95-91
|L 90-94
|
|-
|align=left|Stephane Gilbert
|align=left|Men's individual recurve W1/W2
|602
|13
|W 93-80
|W 101-99
|L 95-99
|colspan=3|Did not advance
|}

Women

|-
|align=left|Brigitte Duboc
|align=left|Women's individual recurve standing
|572
|3
|Bye
|W 99-78
|L 88-101
|colspan=3|Did not advance
|-
|align=left|Lelia Maufras du Chatelliet
|align=left|Women's individual recurve W1/W2
|557
|6
|Bye
|W 98-94
|L 84-90
|colspan=3|Did not advance
|}

Athletics

Men's track

Men's field

Women's track

Women's field

Cycling

Men's road

Men's track

Women's road

Equestrian

Judo

Men

Women

Powerlifting

Men

Women

Rowing

Sailing

Shooting

Men

Women

Swimming

Men

Women

Table tennis

Men's singles

Women's singles

Men's teams

Women's teams

Wheelchair fencing

Men

Women

Wheelchair tennis

Men

Women

See also
France at the Paralympics
France at the 2008 Summer Olympics

References

External links
 Beijing 2008 Paralympic Games
International Paralympic Committee

Nations at the 2008 Summer Paralympics
2008
Paralympics